Not My Mama's Meals is a Cooking Channel series hosted by Bobby Deen, which debuted on January 4, 2012.  In the series, Bobby Deen takes inspiration from his mother Paula's recipes, reworking them into healthier versions reducing fat and calorie content.  Clips from Paula Deen's various Food Network series are commonly shown with limited nutritional information to contrast with that of Bobby Deen's preparation, which is filmed on location at his New York City apartment.  Paula Deen appears as well, typically from her Savannah home, trying samples of her son's reworked dishes.

Episodes

External links
 
 Not My Mama's Meals homepage on Cooking Channel website

2012 American television series debuts
2010s American cooking television series
Cooking Channel original programming
Television shows set in New York (state)
English-language television shows